Chen Tong-jong (born 23 November 1969) is a Taiwanese alpine skier. He competed at the 1988 Winter Olympics and the 1992 Winter Olympics.

References

1969 births
Living people
Taiwanese male alpine skiers
Olympic alpine skiers of Taiwan
Alpine skiers at the 1988 Winter Olympics
Alpine skiers at the 1992 Winter Olympics
Place of birth missing (living people)